Johnny Gill is the debut studio album by American singer-songwriter Johnny Gill, released on April 6, 1983, by Cotillion Records. The album was produced by Freddie Perren. It did not chart in the United States; however, the album's two singles, "Super Love" and "When Something Is Wrong with My Baby", peaked at number 29 and number 57 on the Billboard R&B chart, respectively.

Track listing

Personnel

Johnny Gill – lead vocals, backing vocals, bass, lead guitar, drums, bongos
Freddie Perren – arranger, producer, synthesizer bass, rhythm arrangements, drum programming 
Clarence McDonald – piano 
Cornelius Mims – bass 
Carmen Twillie – backing vocals 
Eddie Watkins – bass 
Elliot Wolff – synthesizer, Fender Rhodes, arranger 
Dennis King – mastering 
Maxine Waters – backing vocals 
Julia Waters – backing vocals 
Ric Wyatt Jr. – synthesizer, arranger, piano, synthesizer bass, producer, backing vocals, keyboards 
David Michael Kennedy – photography 
Ed Biggs – engineer, remixing 
Ronald Adkins – backing vocals 
Larry R. McIntosh – backing vocals 
Harold Ferguson – backing vocals 
James Goforth – engineer 
Gene Page – string arrangements 
Wade Marcus – string arrangements 
Bob Brown – remixing 
Lawrence Hilton-Jacobs – synthesizer strings 
John Barnes – Fender Rhodes 
Robert Bowles – guitar programming 
Leon "Ndugu" Chancler – drums 
Charles Fearing – guitar

Notes

References

External links
 
 

1983 debut albums
Albums arranged by Gene Page
Albums arranged by Wade Marcus
Albums produced by Freddie Perren
Cotillion Records albums
Johnny Gill albums